Steno Diabetes Center is a hospital, research and teaching center dedicated to treating and managing diabetes, located in Gentofte, Denmark. It is named after Nicolas Steno (Niels Steensen, 1638–1686).  The center was established in 1991 as a result of the merger of the Niels Steensen Hospital and Hvidøre Hospital.  The Niels Steensen hospital was founded in 1932.

External links 
Official website (in Danish)
Official website (in English)

Hospitals in Denmark
Medical education in Denmark
Teaching hospitals
Diabetes organizations